Ravalli is a surname. Notable people with the surname include:

 Antonio Ravalli (1812–1884), Italian Jesuit missionary
 Giorgio Ravalli (1925–2001), Italian field hockey player
 Giovanni Ravalli (1909–1998), Italian military officer

See also
 Ravalli, Montana, town in Lake County, Montana
 Ravalli County, Montana

Italian-language surnames